Simolestes (meaning "snub-nosed thief") is an extinct pliosaurid genus that lived in the Middle to Late Jurassic. The type specimen, BMNH R. 3319 is an almost complete but crushed skeleton diagnostic to Simolestes vorax, dating back to the Callovian of the Oxford Clay formation, England. The genus is also known from the Callovian and Bajocian of France (S.keileni), and the Tithonian of India (S.indicus). The referral of these two species to Simolestes is dubious, however.

Description

Simolestes possessed a short, high, and wide skull which was built to resist torsional forces when hunting.

Palaeobiology
Like most Pliosaurs, Simolestes possessed salt secreting glands, which would have enabled the animal to maintain salt balance and drink seawater. Recent studies on Plesiosaur locomotion indicate that Simolestes, like other Plesiosaurs, possessed a unique bauplan for movement, which differs from modern organisms in similar niches.

Feeding habits
Simolestes'''s exact feeding habits are unclear. The current consensus, however, is that the genus was primarily teuthophagous, consuming belemnites, soft teuthoids and ammonites. It is possible Simolestes was also ecologically separated from other contemporary pliosaur genera such as Liopleurodon and Pachycostasaurus'' by hunting in deeper waters or at night, as modern cephalopods exhibit diurnal feeding cycles, spending daylight in deeper, safer waters, and rising at night to feed.

Classification

The cladogram below follows a 2011 analysis by paleontologists Hilary F. Ketchum and Roger B. J. Benson, and reduced to genera only.

References

Pliosaurids
Plesiosaurs of Asia
Middle Jurassic plesiosaurs of Europe
Late Jurassic plesiosaurs of Europe
Oxford Clay
Taxa named by Charles William Andrews
Fossil taxa described in 1909
Sauropterygian genera